Anastasiia Smirnova (born April 20, 2004) is a Ukrainian-born pair skater who represents the United States. With her skating partner, Danylo Siianytsia, she is the 2022 CS Golden Spin of Zagreb champion. They are also the 2021 U.S. junior national champions and finished in the top ten at two World Junior Championships.

Personal life 
Smirnova was born on April 20, 2004 in Dnipro, Ukraine in a Russian-speaking family. As of 2021, she is in her last year of an online Ukrainian high school. Smirnova came to the United States in mid-2018 on a P-1 visa and hopes to gain U.S. citizenship.

Smirnova has a pet kitten named Bunny. She previously coached Learn to Skate lessons at the Shakopee Ice Arena, where she trains.

Career

Early career 
Smirnova began skating in 2010 in Dnipro. Her first pairs partner was Artem Darenskyi. Coached by Lilia Batutina, Smirnova/Darenskyi were the 2015 Ukrainian junior national silver medalists and the 2016 Ukrainian junior national champion. They competed at two Junior Grand Prix events, placing ninth at 2017 JGP Latvia and 11th at 2017 JGP Belarus, before splitting in fall 2017.

Smirnova teamed up with Danylo Siianytsia in mid-2018 after he found her profile on IcePartnerSearch and asked his coach, Trudy Oltmanns, to arrange a tryout. She moved from Ukraine to train with Siianytsia under Oltmanns in Shakopee, Minnesota. In their first season together, they won the novice bronze medal at the 2019 U.S. Championships.

2019–20 season 
Smirnova/Siianytsia made their junior international debut at 2019 JGP Russia, where they finished seventh overall. They then competed at the 2019–20 U.S. Pairs Final and won the bronze medal, qualifying them to the 2020 U.S. Championships. At the 2019 Golden Spin of Zagreb in December, Smirnova/Siianytsia earned their first international medal, silver behind Georgia's Butaeva/Berulava.

At the 2020 U.S. Championships, Smirnova/Siianytsia were third in the short program but won the free skate to earn the silver medal behind Finster/Nagy. As a result, they were named to the 2020 World Junior Championships team. Smirnova/Siianytsia finished tenth at the World Junior Championships.

2020–21 season 
After the COVID-19 pandemic in Minnesota caused their training rink to close, Smirnova/Siianytsia temporarily relocated with their coach to her old rink in Sioux Center, Iowa. The Junior Grand Prix, where they would have competed, was also affected by the COVID-19 pandemic and canceled.

In January, Smirnova/Siianytsia won the junior title at the 2021 U.S. Championships by over 20 points ahead of silver medalists Martins/Bedard, despite Smirnova suffering a high ankle sprain on her right leg in practice the day before competition began. Siianytsia reflected that they were "pretty excited" about the win and "hopefully, it won't be our last one."

2021–22 season 
Smirnova/Siianytsia returned to international competition on the Junior Grand Prix. They were fourth overall in Poland despite placing third in each segment and finished sixth in Austria. They also competed on the senior level for the first time, placing ninth at the Skating Club of Boston's Cranberry Cup. Both skaters contracted COVID-19 in December and withdrew from the 2022 U.S. Junior Championships.

Despite their absence from the national championships, Smirnova/Siianytsia were named to the American team for the 2022 World Junior Championships, which had been originally scheduled to be held in Sofia, but due to the pandemic were moved to Tallinn in mid-April. Due to Vladimir Putin's invasion of Ukraine, the International Skating Union banned all Russian athletes from competing at the event. This had a significant impact on the pairs field, long dominated by Russia. The invasion of their native country was a difficult experience for both, with both having family members still living there, some of whom evacuated to Poland. Siianytsia called it "terrifying for our family." Smirnova/Siianytsia placed third in the short program, winning a bronze small medal, their only error being Smirnova underrotating and stepping out of her double Axel. However, the free program proved to be difficult, with Siianytsia falling on both jumps, Smirnova falling on their second throw jump, and then their second lift aborted. They dropped to fourth place overall.

2022–23 season 
Moving to the international senior level full-time, Smirnova/Siianytsia made their Challenger debut at the 2022 CS Finlandia Trophy, where they finished in seventh place. Given two Grand Prix assignments, they were scheduled to make their debut at the 2022 Skate America but had to withdraw after Siianytsia suffered a groin injury. Despite this, they were able to attend their second event, the 2022 Grand Prix of Espoo, five weeks later. They finished second in the short program. However, they dropped to fourth place after the free skate.

Programs

With Siianytsia

With Darenskyi

Competitive highlights 
GP: Grand Prix; CS: Challenger Series; JGP: Junior Grand Prix

With Siianytsia for the United States

With Darenskyi for Ukraine

Detailed results 
ISU Personal Best highlighted in bold.

 With Siianytsia

Senior results

Junior results

Novice results

References

External links 
 
 Anastasiia Smirnova and Danil Siianytsia at U.S. Figure Skating
 
 

2004 births
Living people
Ukrainian female pair skaters
American female pair skaters
Sportspeople from Dnipro
Ukrainian emigrants to the United States